{{DISPLAYTITLE:1 33 honeycomb}}

In 7-dimensional geometry, 133 is a uniform honeycomb, also given by Schläfli symbol {3,33,3}, and is composed of [[1 32 polytope|132]] facets.

Construction

It is created by a Wythoff construction upon a set of 8 hyperplane mirrors in 7-dimensional space.

The facet information can be extracted from its Coxeter-Dynkin diagram.
  

Removing a node on the end of one of the 3-length branch leaves the 132, its only facet type.
  

The vertex figure is determined by removing the ringed node and ringing the neighboring node. This makes the trirectified 7-simplex, 033.
  

The edge figure is determined by removing the ringed nodes of the vertex figure and ringing the neighboring node. This makes the tetrahedral duoprism, {3,3}×{3,3}.
  

 Kissing number 

Each vertex of this polytope corresponds to the center of a 6-sphere in a moderately dense sphere packing, in which each sphere is tangent to 70 others; the best known for 7 dimensions (the kissing number) is 126.

 Geometric folding 

 E7* lattice 
 contains  as a subgroup of index 144.

The E7* lattice (also called E72) has double the symmetry, represented by [[3,33,3]]. The Voronoi cell of the E7* lattice is the 132 polytope, and voronoi tessellation the 133 honeycomb. The E7* lattice is constructed by 2 copies of the E7 lattice vertices, one from each long branch of the Coxeter diagram, and can be constructed as the union of four A7* lattices, also called A74:

 Related polytopes and honeycombs

The 133 is fourth in a dimensional series of uniform polytopes and honeycombs, expressed by Coxeter as 13k series. The final is a noncompact hyperbolic honeycomb, 134.

 Rectified 133 honeycomb

 See also 
 8-polytope
 331 honeycomb

 Notes 

 References 
 H.S.M. Coxeter, Regular Polytopes, 3rd Edition, Dover New York, 1973 
 Coxeter The Beauty of Geometry: Twelve Essays, Dover Publications, 1999,  (Chapter 3: Wythoff's Construction for Uniform Polytopes)
 Kaleidoscopes: Selected Writings of H.S.M. Coxeter', edited by F. Arthur Sherk, Peter McMullen, Anthony C. Thompson, Asia Ivic Weiss, Wiley-Interscience Publication, 1995,  
 (Paper 24) H.S.M. Coxeter, Regular and Semi-Regular Polytopes III'', [Math. Zeit. 200 (1988) 3–45]
 
 

8-polytopes